The 2019–20 FA Women's Championship was the second season of the rebranded FA Women's Championship, the second tier of women's football in England.  It was renamed from the FA WSL 2 which was founded in 2014. The season began on 18 August 2019.

On 13 March 2020, in line with the FA's response to the coronavirus pandemic, it was announced the season was temporarily suspended until at least 3 April 2020. Following further postponements, the season was ultimately ended prematurely on 25 May 2020 with immediate effect. 

On 5 June 2020, Aston Villa, who sat six points clear and had gone unbeaten in the season so far, were awarded the league title and promoted to the WSL on sporting merit after The FA Board's decision to award places on a points-per-game basis. Despite finishing last, Charlton Athletic were spared relegation after the seasons from tier three and below were null and voided  and results had been expunged.

Teams

Twelve teams were originally scheduled to compete in the Championship for the 2019–20 season, an increase of one team from the previous season. This was a planned progression of the restructuring of the English women's game, a move prompted to provide for a fully professional Women's Super League (WSL) starting with the 2018–19 season. Membership of both the first and second tier is subject to a license, based on a series of off-the-field criteria.

However, at the end of the 2018–19 Championship the top two teams, Manchester United and Tottenham Hotspur, gained promotion to the WSL. They were scheduled to be replaced by Yeovil Town, who were relegated from the WSL after finishing 11th in the 2018–19 season but the team was denied a license in May 2019 and instead granted third tier status. The two promoted teams were Blackburn Rovers, the winners of the 2018–19 FA Women's National League Northern Division, and Coventry United, the winners of  Southern Division. As a result, the competition shall run with only 11 teams for the second consecutive season.

No teams were relegated from the Championship following 2018–19 season to facilitate the expansion from 11 to 12 teams. However, because 11 teams only contested the 2019–20 season, the winners of the National League North and South divisions will both once again be promoted while one Championship team will be relegated.

On 13 May 2019, a Millwall FC statement announced the Lionesses team was no longer affiliating itself with the men's team, instead forming an independent and fully professional breakaway team called London City Lionesses for the start of the 2019–20 season with the aim of transferring the operating license of the old Lionesses team. Millwall also announced their intention to retain its own women's team with the support of the Community Trust, eventually contesting the season in the fifth tier Eastern Region Women's Football League.

Managerial changes

Table
In a change from the previous season, there was a one up one down system between the WSL and Championship meaning only the first placed team would be automatically promoted subject to obtaining a licence instead of two, with one WSL team relegated to take their place. Still with a view to expanding the top two tiers to twelve teams each by the start of the 2020–21 season, one Championship team would have been relegated and replaced by the winners of both the National League North and South divisions regardless of the result of the Championship play-off but again subject to obtaining a licence. However, while the movement between the WSL and Championship was honoured, there was no relegation or promotion between the Championship and National League after the seasons from tier three and below were null and voided and results had been expunged.

Results

Top goalscorers

Awards

Monthly awards 
Results of Manager of the Month as awarded by the League Managers Association. Number of awards in brackets. Results of Player of the Month voting as polled by FA Women's Championship. Number of nominations in brackets.

Annual awards 
The end of season awards were announced on 27 July 2020.

See also
2019–20 FA Women's League Cup
2019–20 FA WSL (tier 1)
2019–20 FA Women's National League (tier 3 & 4)

References

External links
Official website

Women's Championship (England)
2
FA Women's Championship
England